Mulla Makhan railway station 
(Sindh: مُلان مکڻ ريلوي اسٽيشن) is  located in Taluka Hala, District Matiari, Sindh, Pakistan.

See also
 List of railway stations in Pakistan
 Pakistan Railways

References

External links

Railway stations in Sindh